Peters' frog may refer to:

 Peters' dwarf frog, a frog found in Colombia, Ecuador, and Peru
 Peters' frog (Australia), a frog endemic to northern Australia
 Peters' frog (India), a frog endemic to the Western Ghats in southern India
 Peters' robber frog, a frog found in Colombia and Ecuador

Animal common name disambiguation pages